Paradise Interchange is a bus interchange operated by Adelaide Metro in Paradise, South Australia as part of the O-Bahn Busway.

History
Paradise Interchange was built as the terminating station of Stage 1 of the O-Bahn Busway. It was officially opened on 2 March 1986 by Premier John Bannon, with services commencing on 9 March. The busway was extended to Tea Tree Plaza Interchange on 20 August 1989.

It is located mid-way along the O-Bahn Busway, between Klemzig Interchange and Tea Tree Plaza Interchange, six kilometres (3.7 mi) from the Adelaide city centre. Paradise Interchange has 625 car parking spaces, and is located on the south side of Darley Road, with access roads permitting buses to transfer between local roads and the busway.

Paradise Interchange is served by 34 routes.

References

External links

Adelaide O-Bahn
Bus stations in Australia
Transport infrastructure completed in 1986
Transport buildings and structures in South Australia